The Erpobdelliformes are one of the currently-accepted suborders of the proboscisless leeches (Arhynchobdellida). It includes five families:

Americobdellidae
Erpobdellidae Blanchard, 1894
Gastrostomobdellidae Richardson, 1971
Orobdellidae Nakano, Ramlah & Hikida, 2012
Salifidae Johansson, 1910

References

Leeches